Jeppe Lund Curth (born 21 March 1984) is a Danish former professional footballer who played as a forward. He played 43 matches and scored 15 goals for various Danish youth national teams, most recently the Danish national under-21 team.

Career 
Curth signed his first youth contract with Danish club Farum BK when he turned 16. He was called up for various Danish youth national teams, debuting for the under-16 squad in March 2000. After several training sessions with Dutch club Feyenoord, he was brought into the youth setup of the club in April 2001. From 2001 to 2003, Curth scored ten goals in 13 games for the Danish under-19 national team, and he was named 2002 Danish Young Player of the Year.

He had a hard time forcing his way into the Feyenoord line-up. He was loaned out to team Excelsior, based in Rotterdam like Feyenoord, for the 2004–05 season, where he made his senior debut and scored eight goals in 19 games. When his contract with Feyenoord expired in July 2005, he returned to Denmark to play for AaB in the Danish Superliga. In his first time with AaB, Curth played both as an attacking midfielder and forward, before settling as the striking partner of Sweden international forward Rade Prica in the 2006–07 Superliga season.

On 10. June 2014, Curth signed with Viborg FF on a free transfer. Curth retired in August 2017.

Honours
AaB
 Danish Superliga: 2008, 2014
 Danish Cup: 2014

Individual
 Danish Young Player of the Year: 2002
 Danish Superliga top goalscorer: 2008

References

External links

Career stats at Danmarks Radio

1984 births
Living people
People from Furesø Municipality
Association football forwards
Danish men's footballers
Denmark youth international footballers
Denmark under-21 international footballers
FC Nordsjælland players
Feyenoord players
Excelsior Rotterdam players
AaB Fodbold players
FC Midtjylland players
Eerste Divisie players
Danish Superliga players
Danish expatriate men's footballers
Expatriate footballers in the Netherlands
Danish expatriate sportspeople in the Netherlands
Sportspeople from the Capital Region of Denmark